Nebraska Highway 250 (N-250) is a highway in northwestern Nebraska.  Its southern terminus is at N-2, east of Ellsworth. N-250 does not intersect any state maintained road, until it reaches its northern terminus at U.S. Highway 20 (US 20) in Rushville. The route was designated in 1960, and was extended south in 1996.

Route description
All of the route is in Sheridan County. N-250 starts at N-2, south of Lakeside. The road shortly crosses a railroad owned by BNSF Railway and enters Lakeside. N-250 shifts west slightly, and bends around a lake. The route travels north, through sand hills, and passing by small lakes and ponds. East of Thompson Lake, N-250 intersects the 304th Trail, a road that connects to other lakes.  later, the road 298th Trail, which connects the Twin Lakes to the highway. A few miles later, the highway passes the Smith Lake State Wildlife Management Area, and crosses over the Niobrara River later. The road enters Rushville as Chamberlain Street. It enters downtown, and ends at US 20. In 2012, the Nebraska Department of Roads (NDOR) calculated as many as 305 vehicles traveling on N-250 near Rushville, and as few as 90 vehicles traveling north of Lakeside. This is expressed in terms of annual average daily traffic (AADT), a measure of traffic volume for any average day of the year.

History
A metal-surfaced road from US 20 in Rushville to north of the Niobrara River was constructed between 1940 and 1948. It was extended south to north of Cravath Lake by 1953. The road was removed from the highway system map in 1957, and was re-added in 1960, as N-250. A narrow road was extended from N-250 to N-2 around 1981–82, but it was not part of N-250 until 1996. The routing has not changed significantly since.

Major intersections

References

External links

Nebraska Roads: NE 202-392

250
Transportation in Sheridan County, Nebraska